Yatala is a former electorate of the South Australian House of Assembly located within the cadastral Hundred of Yatala. It was one of the original Assembly districts in 1857, abolished in 1902.

Yatala was also the name of an electoral district of the unicameral South Australian Legislative Council from 1851 until its abolition in 1857, William Giles, then Arthur Blyth being the members.

Rural at the time, most parts of the district would now be considered metropolitan.

Members

References

Electoral districts of South Australia
1857 establishments in Australia
1902 disestablishments in Australia